Matthew Bickford (1839–1918) received the Medal of Honor for his actions during the American Civil War.

Biography
He was born in Peoria County, Illinois in 1839. He entered service at "Trivolia", Peoria County, Illinois.  He was a Corporal, in Company G, 8th Missouri Volunteer Infantry, Union Army. He received the Medal of Honor for Gallantry in the charge of the "volunteer storming party" at Vicksburg, Mississippi, May 22, 1863.

Bickford moved to Washington state around 1907. He died in 1918, and is buried in Bayview Cemetery in Bellingham, Washington.

Medal of Honor citation
 Rank and organization: Corporal, Company G, 8th Missouri Infantry.
 Place and date: At Vicksburg, Miss., May 22, 1863.
 Entered service at: Trivolia, Peoria County, Ill.
 Birth: Peoria County, Ill.
 Date of issue: August 31, 1894.

Citation:

Gallantry in the charge of the "volunteer storming party."

See also

List of American Civil War Medal of Honor recipients: A–F
Battle of Vicksburg
8th Regiment Missouri Volunteer Infantry

Notes

References

External links

A Forlorn Hope
Vicksburg Medal of Honor Recipients

1839 births
1918 deaths
United States Army Medal of Honor recipients
People from Peoria County, Illinois
People from Bellingham, Washington
People of Illinois in the American Civil War
People of Missouri in the American Civil War
Union Army soldiers
American Civil War recipients of the Medal of Honor